Teafuanonu is an uninhabited islet on the north-east of Nukufetau atoll, Tuvalu.

See also

 Desert island
 List of islands

References

Uninhabited islands of Tuvalu
Pacific islands claimed under the Guano Islands Act
Nukufetau